The J-Bay Open 2015 was an event of the World Surf League Championship Tour.

This event was held from July 8-19, 2015 at Jeffreys Bay, (Eastern Cape, South Africa) with 36 professional surfers.

The final of the tournament was canceled because Mick Fanning was attacked by a shark.

Mick Fanning (AUS) and Julian Wilson (AUS) were second, because of the attack.

Round 1

Round 2

Round 3

Round 4

Round 5

Quarter finals

Semi finals

Final

References

2015 World Surf League
J-Bay Open
2015 in South African sport
Sport in the Eastern Cape